The 2012–13 Portland State Vikings men's basketball team represented Portland State University during the 2012–13 NCAA Division I men's basketball season. The Vikings, led by fourth year head coach Tyler Geving, played their home games at the Peter Stott Center and were members of the Big Sky Conference. They finished the season 8–20, 5–15 in Big Sky play to finish in a tie for tenth place. They failed to qualify for the Big Sky tournament.

Roster

Schedule

|-
!colspan=9| Exhibition

|-
!colspan=9| Regular season

References

Portland State Vikings men's basketball seasons
Portland State
Portland State Vikings men's basketball
Portland State Vikings men's basketball
Port
Port